Nixon-Smiley Consolidated Independent School District is a public school district based in Nixon, Texas (USA). In addition to Nixon, the district also serves the city of Smiley.

Located in Gonzales County, small portions of the district extend into Guadalupe, Karnes and Wilson counties.

The district was formed in 1983 from the consolidation of the Nixon and Smiley districts, with Smiley ISD consolidating into Nixon-Smiley CISD.

Notable people
In 2016, Superintendent Dr. Cathy Lauer (2004–2021) was named Texas Association of School Boards (TASB) Region 13 Superintendent of the Year.

In 2018, a former Nixon city manager and local substitute teacher, Manuel Zepeda, was charged with 11 sexual felonies; Nixon-Smiley students were involved.

References

External links
Nixon-Smiley Consolidated ISD

School districts in Gonzales County, Texas
School districts in Guadalupe County, Texas
School districts in Karnes County, Texas
School districts in Wilson County, Texas